M. albus  may refer to:
 Monopterus albus, a swamp eel species
 Melilotus albus, a sweet clover species
 Muscodor albus, a plant-dwelling fungus species

See also
 Albus (disambiguation)